Cvetke is a village in the municipality of Kraljevo, western-central Serbia. According to the 2002 census, the village has a population of 1070 people.

Notable people
Jovan Kursula (1768–1813), Serbian revolutionary.

References

Populated places in Raška District